Eamon Denis Boland (born 15 July 1947 in Manchester, Lancashire) is an English actor.

He has played Tony Walker in Casualty, Frank O'Connor in Coronation Street, Gerry Hollis in Kinsey, Jim Gray in The Chief, Phil Fox in Fox and Clive in Singles. He has also appeared in The Gentle Touch, The Bill, Stay Lucky, Soldier Soldier, The Grand, Peak Practice, Brookside, Doctors, Early Doors, Heartbeat, Spearhead and Holby City. He played George Sugden in Heartbeat series 11 episode 18.

He had a regular role as Dennis, a seaside photographer, in the Thames Television sitcom Hope It Rains, which ran from 1991 to 1992.

References

External links
 

English male stage actors
English male soap opera actors
Male actors from Manchester
1947 births
Living people